ZhongAn Online P&C Insurance Co. Ltd. is a Chinese online-only insurance company. Founded in 2013, the company's headquarters are based in Shanghai, China. ZhongAn's chairman and executive director is Yaping Ou who is also an executive director. The company's CEO is Jin “Jeffrey” Chen but was initially co-founded by China's most notable business magnates- the chairmen of Chinese multinational conglomerates. This includes Alibaba’s Jack Ma, Tencent's Pony Ma and Ping An Insurance's Mingzhe Ma. Together, the three businessmen created the country’s first and largest insurance company to offer and sell products through the internet. There are five important areas of service that the company offers and sells; lifestyle consumption, consumer finance, health, auto and travel. In addition to insurance services, ZhongAn has established numerous subsidiaries such as ZhongAn International and ZhongAn Information and Technology Services and Co. As of January 2019, ZhongAn has a total market capitalization of HK$38.5 billion.

Markets 
The insurance technology company is listed on the Hong Kong Stock Exchange under the stock code ‘6060:HK’. ZhongAn began floating on the stock exchange in September 2017 and raised US$1.5 billion on its opening day, at a valuation of US$11 billion. This made it the largest initial public offering in Hong Kong in 2017 and also the first insurance technology offering that Hong Kong had. ZhongAn's share prices increased by more than 9% on the opening day of their public trading to HK$65.20. Alvin Cheung Chi-Wai, an associate director at Prudential Brokerage in Hong Kong, said, “The main reason is not ZhongAn displaying attractive quality but the three 'horses' backing it” – in reference to the company's three original founders, as ‘Ma’ in Chinese translates to meaning ‘horse’. The day after its IPO, its share price declined by 2.7%. In China, the insurtech industry is expected to grow significantly from approximately US$37 billion in 2015 to US$174 billion in 2020. By the end of 2016, ZhongAn made up 0.9% of China's insurtech market and gained a competitive advantage by having a special digital insurance license before its competitors.

Products and services 
Since ZhongAn's inception, it has up to 460 million users and has issued over 5.8 billion insurance policies. A significant proportion of its customer base (60%), are aged 20 to 35 and most consumers from this age group bought their first insurance policy through the company. ZhongAn offers a wide range of personalised products and services to its Chinese consumers.

Business 
ZhongAn has a subsidiary called ZhongAn International, founded in December 2017.
In August 2018, ZhongAn created a second partnership with a Boston-based biotechnology company, Orig3n.

ZhongAn Information and Technology Services and Co., or simply known as ZhongAn Technology, is also another subsidiary that was created in November 2016. ZhongAn Technology focuses on R&D (research and development). The new subsidiary has four key areas of focus: artificial intelligence, blockchain technology, cloud computing and data driven analytics. In 2018, ZhongAn Technology announced a partnership agreement with Chinese insurance company, AXA Tianping. This partnership marked the launch of ZhongAn's SaaS platform (software-as-a-service) which aims to offer insurance companies with three key products; accessibility to medical records that come from medical institutions, online services that assist in providing compensation for insurance companies and risk management services.

Furthermore, ZhongAn also aims to expand their businesses overseas in the Japanese market through their newly formed business partnership with Sompo Japan Nipponka. As a Japanese insurance company, Sompo Holdings is one of the largest property insurance companies in the Japanese market. This partnership will aim to create an insurance service that is entirely cloud-based. ZhongAn will provide an opportunity for the Japanese company to enhance its insurance services through technology and digitalisation. As such, Sompo Japan Nipponka will directly provide ZhongAn with an opportunity to enter the international market, specifically focusing on the Asian region. ZhongAn's entry into Japan is expected to have a significant impact as opposed to Japan's insurance startups such as JustInCase. This is because demand for digitised products in insurance have increased. Overall, both companies have high hopes that their synergy will digitally transform the insurance industry by offering new, innovative products in 2019.

Founders and key individuals  
Yaping Ou is the current executive chairman of ZhongAn since its inception in 2013. He was previously the chairman and executive director of property development company, Sinolink Worldwide Holdings, Ltd from 1997 to 2013. He also came 62nd on Forbes’ list of 400 richest Chinese individuals in 2005, with a net worth of US$273 million. Ou has worked in numerous investing and trading companies in both the China region and Hong Kong. ZhongAn's chairman appointed his son, Jinyu Ou, as a non-executive director to provide professional assistance to the Board. He is also part of the Investment Strategy Committee of ZhongAn.  The CEO of ZhongAn is Jin “Jeffrey” Chen who was previously a vice president in China Merchants Fund Management Co Ltd from 2003 to 2005 and also in China Merchants Securities from 2002 and 2003. The company, however, was originally co-founded by Jack Ma from Alibaba, Pony Ma from Tencent Holdings and Ma Mingzhe from Ping An Insurance Group. All three entrepreneurs are also the company's largest shareholders. It is a common belief that Hong Kong's retail investors don't have much knowledge in ZhongAn's company or its business and have only invested due to the three Ma's.

References 

Financial services companies established in 2013
Companies based in Shanghai
Companies listed on the Hong Kong Stock Exchange
Chinese companies established in 2013
Online insurance companies
Insurance companies of China